Saymon Musie (born 22 January 1998) is an Eritrean cyclist, who currently rides for Spanish amateur team Aluminios Cortizo.

Major results

2017
 1st Massawa Circuit
 2nd Overall Tour du Faso
 3rd Asmara Circuit
 6th Overall Tour Eritrea
 9th Overall Tour of Quanzhou Bay
2018
 African Road Championships
1st  Team time trial (with Mekseb Debesay, Metkel Eyob and Amanuel Gebrezgabihier)
3rd  Under-23 Time trial
8th Time trial

References

1998 births
Living people
Eritrean male cyclists